The 2024 United States Senate election in Maryland will be held on November 5, 2024, to elect a member of the United States Senate to represent the state of Maryland. Incumbent three-term Democratic Senator Ben Cardin was elected in 2018 with 64.9% of the vote.

Democratic primary
Incumbent Senator Ben Cardin would be 81 years old if sworn in for a fourth term to the U.S. Senate in January of 2025, fueling speculation that he may choose to retire.

Candidates

Filed paperwork
 Steve Seuferer

Publicly expressed interest
 Angela Alsobrooks, Prince George's County executive (2018–present)

Potential
 Ben Cardin, incumbent U.S. Senator (2007–present) (decision expected by April 2023)
 John Olszewski Jr., Baltimore County Executive (2018–present) and former state delegate from the 6th district (2006–2015)
 Jamie Raskin, U.S. Representative for Maryland's 8th congressional district (2017–present)
 John Sarbanes, U.S. Representative for Maryland's 3rd congressional district (2007–present)
 David Trone, U.S. Representative for Maryland's 6th congressional district (2019–present)

Republican primary

Candidates

Filed paperwork 
 Robin Ficker, former state delegate (1979–1983) and perennial candidate

Potential 
 Michael Steele, former chair of the Republican National Committee (2009–2011), former Lieutenant Governor of Maryland (2003–2007), and nominee for U.S. Senate in 2006

Declined 
 Larry Hogan, former Governor of Maryland (2015–2023)

Third-party candidates

Candidates

Filed paperwork 
 Moshe Landman (Green), candidate for Maryland's 39th Senate district in 2022

General election

Predictions

References

External links
 Robin Ficker (R) for U.S. Senate
 Moshe Landman (G) for U.S. Senate

2024
Maryland
United States Senate